Jiangbei District is a district of Chongqing municipality.Its population is about 700,000.

Administrative divisions

Transport

Metro
Jiangbei is currently served by 3 metro lines operated by Chongqing Rail Transit:
 Huaxinjie, Guanyinqiao
 Wulidian, Hongtudi, Huangnibang
 Liyuchi, Guanyinqiao, 
 Liyuchi, Hongtudi

References

 
Districts of Chongqing